Maya is a 2016 Sri Lankan Sinhala 3D horror comedy film directed by Donald Jayantha and co-produced by Raja Sadesh Kumar and Srimathi Sadesh Kumar. It stars Ranjan Ramanayake, Pubudu Chathuranga in lead roles along with Giriraj Kaushalya, Nilmini Kottegoda and Upeksha Swarnamali. It is the 1257th Sri Lankan film in the Sinhala cinema. The film is based on Indian Tamil film Kanchana directed by Raghava Lawrence.

Plot
Malan is a jobless 25 year-old youth who spends his days playing cricket with friends. He suffers from an irrational fear of ghosts and retreats to the safety of his home after sunset. His fear is so great he prefers to sleep with his widowed mother Geetha and have her accompany him to the bathroom at night, and also at the eating time. This creates major annoyance in the household, including Malan's brother Gamini, sister-in-law Nirmala  and their children.

One night, Malan meets a girl named Shaini and flirts to gain her attraction, but did not reveal it. Shaini also had some attraction to Malan and she started to flirt around him as well. Meanwhile, One day, Malan and his friends are forced to abandon their usual cricket ground and find a new one; one friend select an abandoned ground which is rumored to be haunted. A bizarre weather change scares them away. Malan brings home his cricket stumps, which have been stained with blood from a buried corpse in the ground. He focuses on wooing Shaini, where she asked Malan to come to a dinner. But as he is fear for ghosts, he went to the hotel with all his family. At the dinner, however, Malan's mother agreed on their relationship and fixed a date to meet Shaini's family. In the following days, his mother and sister-in-law are witness to several paranormal phenomena at night; prominently a ghost haunting the hallways. On consulting am exorcist, they perform 3 rituals to ascertain if the house is haunted:

1. They keep a coconut on a Rangoli and pray with chants. The coconut rotates on its own.

2. They keep an egg on a pan and see whether it turns color or explode it.

3. They leave a lit lamp and two drops of blood and leave the house. A ghost of a woman appears before them and licks the blood.

Scared senseless, Geeta and Nirmala hire two priests to rid their home of the ghost. The priests, however, are conmen, and escape with their lives. That night, the ghost possesses Malan, who begins acting increasingly effeminate, alienating himself from Shaini and wearing women's clothes and jewelry. His family angrily confronts him, when it is revealed that there are actually three ghosts who have possessed him: a violent woman named Maya, a Tamil Hindu Man named Ramu, and a learning-disabled boy. With the possession, Malan kills a woman by hanging and a thug Wasantha by engraving him with his van. Malan's family ask a Buddhist monk, who successfully drives the spirit away from Malan's body. The ghost of the woman, trapped, reveals her story.

Maya/Mayantha is a transgender woman who was disowned by her father because of her behaviour. She is offered shelter by a kind Tamil man Ramu, who has a son with a disability. Regretting that she couldn't become a doctor as she intended, she adopts another young trans person named Madhuri/Madhawi and works hard to support her financially. When Madhuri leaves to study medicine abroad, Maya buys a plot of land where Madhuri intended to construct a hospital for the poor. That ground is unlawfully taken by Minister Ashoka. Maya angrily confronts the minister, who cunningly kills her. He also kills Ramu and his son. Before she died, she vowed to kill minister, his wife, and his henchmen Shantha. The bodies are then buried in Maya's own ground.

The Buddhist monk sympathizes with her, but remains duty-bound and traps her. After hearing her story, Malan is touched; risking the danger, he allows Maya to possess him once again. Malan/Maya confronts the minister, and disposes of his henchmen gruesomely. The minister seeks refuge in a Kali temple which Maya is forbidden from; but she asks the deity for justice and manages to chase him inside the temple. The three spirits combined kill the minister. A few years later, Malan has constructed the hospital for Dr. Madhuri as per Maya's wishes. It is revealed that Maya exists symbiotically in Malan's body to help him out when the need rises.

Cast
  Pubudu Chaturanga as Malan
 Ranjan Ramanayake as Maya/ Mayantha
 Shehara Hewadewa as Shaini
 Giriraj Kaushalya as Gamini
 Nihal Fernando as Ramu
 Sujeewa Priyalal as Madhuri/Madhawi
 Nilmini Kottegoda as Geetha
 Sarath Chandrasiri as Kapuwa
 Wasantha Kumaravila as Shantha
 Ishan Gammudali as Buddhist monk
 Somy Rathnayake as Principal
 Upeksha Swarnamali as Nirmala
 Srimal Wedisinghe as Minister Ashoka
 Mihira Sirithilaka as Ramu's son
 Kumara Thirimadura as Maya's father
 Damitha Abeyratne as Shantha's fiancée
 Anura Bandara Rajaguru as Swami
 Maureen Charuni as Hansi's mother
 Ramani Siriwardena as Shaini's mother
 Nandana Hettiarachchi as Con Priest
 Gunadasa Madurasinghe as Con Priest

Soundtrack

References

එක් සිරුරක් ආත්ම දෙකක් ශ්‍රි ලංකාවේ ප්‍රථම ත්‍රිමාණ චිත්‍රපටය
මායා තිරයට පැමිණි දවස
මම මෝහිනීගේ අවතාරය කියා හිතලා මිනිහා දිව්වේ උසේන් බෝල්ටත් වඩා වේගෙන්

External links 
 
 Maya 3D on YouTube
 Maya 3D on Facebook

2016 films
2010s Sinhala-language films
Horror film remakes
Transgender-related films
Remakes of Sri Lankan films
2016 LGBT-related films